Cody Thompson may refer to:
 Cody Thompson (politician)
 Cody Thompson (American football)